Margarita Wendy Widmann Lagarde de Berger (born 11 August 1946) is a Guatemalan psychologist and the former First Lady of Guatemala to Óscar Berger. She studied sociology at Trinity Washington University in Washington, D.C.

Biography
Wendy de Berger was born on 11 August 1946 in Guatemala City, Guatemala Department, fifth of six children born to Walter Widmann and Carlota Lagarde. She completed her primary and secondary studies at Colegio Monte María. In 1967, she married Óscar Berger and had five children: Oscar, Denise, Juan Esteban, Francisco and Wendy Berger Widmann. Her interest in the humanities led her to study sociology at Trinity Washington University in the District of Columbia, capital of the United States.

First Lady of the City of Guatemala
In 1991, Óscar Berger became the Metropolitan Mayor of Guatemala City, and Wendy de Berger took charge of the city's social affairs, beginning several projects to help vulnerable groups, like women and children. She promoted the construction of low-rent housing and founded a school for children to continue their education from kindergarten and provided nursery programs for impoverished families. In 1996, de Berger began to collaborate with the program Eduquemos a la Niña, designed to help educate troubled adolescents and teenagers and offer them scholarships. During Oscar Berger's presidential campaign in 2003, she designed and embarked on the "National Plan of Women's Crusades."

First Lady of Guatemala
On 14 January 2004, former lawyer Óscar Berger assumed the Presidency of Guatemala, and Wendy assumed control of the Secretariat of Social Works of the Wife of the President of the Republic of Guatemala (SOSEP). Wendy has also collaborated with Dallas-based charity organization Helps International to provide safe, sanitary stoves to poor Guatemalan women who participated in community projects such as in Santo Domingo Xenacoj, where a new bakery was opened with provided stoves.

Citations

1946 births
First ladies of Guatemala
Living people
People from Guatemala City
Guatemalan women psychologists
Guatemalan psychologists
Trinity Washington University alumni
Guatemalan people of German descent